Several fiction, non-fiction and cinemas were based on Kolkata or depicted Kolkata from certain point of views. Some of such works are listed here.

Travelogues

The Great Railway Bazaar (Paul Theroux)
Following the Equator (Mark Twain)

Books

Around the World in Eighty Days
Calcutta (Geoffrey Moorhouse)
City of the Dreadful Night and American Tales (Rudyard Kipling)
City of Joy (Dominique Lapierre)
Calcutta: The Living City Volumes 1 & 2 (ed. Sukanta Chaudhuri)
Calcutta - City of Palaces: A Survey of the City in the Days of the East India Company 1690–1858. (Jeremiah P. Losty)
Calcutta 1981 (ed. Jean Racine)

Films set in Kolkata

Bengali films

 Nagarik - The Citizen (Ritwik Ghatak) (1952 - Released 1977)
 Bari Theke Paliye - The Runaway (Ritwik Ghatak) (1958)
 Mahanagar - The Big City (Satyajit Ray) (1963)
 Apanjan - (Tapan Sinha) (1968)
 Pratidwandi - The Adversary (Satyajit Ray) (1970)
 Seemabaddha - Company Limited (Satyajit Ray) (1971)
 Interview (Mrinal Sen) (1971)
 Calcutta 71 (Mrinal Sen) (1972)
 Padatik - The Guerilla Fighter (Mrinal Sen) (1973)
 Jukti Takko Aar Gappo - Logic, Debate and Story (Ritwik Ghatak) (1974)
 Jana Aranya - The Middleman (Satyajit Ray) (1976)
 Ek Din Pratidin - And Quiet Rolls the Day (Mrinal Sen) (1979)
 Grihajuddha - Crossroads (Buddhadev Dasgupta) (1982)
 Paroma - The Ultimate Woman Aparna Sen (1984)
 Agantuk - The Stranger (Satyajit Ray) (1991)
 Antareen - The Confined (Mrinal Sen) (1993)
 Unishe April  - Nineteenth April(Rituparno Ghosh) (1994)
 Dahan - Crossfire (Rituparno Ghosh) (1997)
 Chokher Bali - Sand in the Eye (Rituparno Ghosh) (2003)
 Kaalbela - Calcutta My Love (Goutam Ghose) (2009)
 Houseful (Bappaditya Bandopadhyay (2009)
 Mahanagar@Kolkata (Suman Mukhopadhyay) (2009)
 033 (Birsa Dasgupta) (2010)
 Ekti Tarar Khonje - Stars Never Sleep  (Abhik Mukhopadhyay) (2010)
 Gorosthaney Sabdhan (Sandip Ray) (2010)
 Autograph (Srijit Mukherji) (2010)

English films

The River (1951 film) (Jean Renoir)
36 Chowringhee Lane (Aparna Sen)
City of Joy (Roland Joffe)
Citi Life - Calcutta My El Dorado (Mrinal Sen)
10 Days in Calcutta (Gerhard Hauff)
Bow Barracks Forever (Anjan Dutt)
Call Cutta (Anjan Dutt)
15 Park Avenue (Aparna Sen)
The Waiting City
The Last Lear
The Avengers, Bruce Banner's hide-out where Natasha Romanoff recruits him for the Avengers
Memories in March
Lion starring Dev Patel and Nicole Kidman
The Namesake

French films
Calcutta (Louis Malle)
The Bengali Night(La Nuit Bengali)

Tamil films

Vedalam

Telugu films

Naayak
Padi Padi Leche Manasu

Malayalam Films

 Vasthuhara
 Calcutta News
 Neelakasham Pachakadal Chuvanna Bhoomi

Hindi films

 Howrah Bridge
 Pyaasa
 Amar Prem
 Do Bigha Zameen
 Devdas (1955)
 Devdas (2002)
 Ram Teri Ganga Maili
 Calcutta Mail
 Hey Ram
 Do Anjaane
 Hazaar Chaurasi Ki Maa
 Morning Walk
 Parineeta
 Vicky Donor
 Yuva
 Raincoat
 Kahaani (2012)
 Barfi!
 I Am
 Khushi
 Love Aaj Kal
 Calcutta Mail
 Gunday
 Badmaash Company
 Kaminey
 Michael by Ribhu Dasgupta
 Lootera
 No One Killed Jessica
 Special 26
 Bullet Raja
 Kolkata Junction
 Babumoshai Bandookbaaz
 Piku
 Highway
 Detective Byomkesh Bakshy!
 Hamari Adhuri Kahani
 Tamasha
 Te3n
 Kahaani 2
 Meri Pyaari Bindu
 Jagga Jasoos
 Pari
 Dhadak
 Chippa

Kolkata in popular culture